Rana Ram Singh, KCIE (26 May 1883 – 29 March 1911) was the Jat ruler of Dholpur state (1901–1911) in what is now Rajasthan, India. He was from Bamraulia gotra of Jats. He was born on 26 May 1883 and succeeded Rana Nihal Singh in 1901 after his death. He was not of age when he ascended to the throne. He got full rights in March 1905.

He married Ripudman Kaur, the daughter of the Maharaja Hira Singh of Nabha. He was educated at Mayo College, Ajmer; later joined the Imperial Cadet Corps.

During his rule the state was divided into six parganas namely, 1. Dholpur, 2. Rajakhedi, 3. Badi, 4. Basaidi, 5. Mania and 6. Kulari. This way the administration of the state was improved.

He died on 2 April 1911. His successor was Rana Udaybhanu Singh.

Titles
1883–1901: Raja Shri Ram Singh Jai Deo Bahadur, Yuvraj Sahib of Dholpur
1901–1908: His Highness Rais ud-Daula, Sipahdar ul-Mulk, Saramad Rajha-i-Hind, Maharajadhiraja Sri Sawai Maharaj Rana Ram Singh Lokendra Bahadur, Diler Jang, Jai Deo, Maharaj Rana of Dholpur
1908–1909: Captain His Highness Rais ud-Daula, Sipahdar ul-Mulk, Saramad Rajha-i-Hind, Maharajadhiraja Sri Sawai Maharaj Rana Ram Singh Lokendra Bahadur, Diler Jang, Jai Deo, Maharaj Rana of Dholpur
1909–1911: Captain His Highness Rais ud-Daula, Sipahdar ul-Mulk, Saramad Rajha-i-Hind, Maharajadhiraja Sri Sawai Maharaj Rana Sir Ram Singh Lokendra Bahadur, Diler Jang, Jai Deo, Maharaj Rana of Dholpur, KCIE

Honours
Delhi Durbar gold medal-1903
Knight Commander of the Order of the Indian Empire (KCIE)-1909

References
Dr. Ajay Kumar Agnihotri (1985) : "Gohad ke jaton ka Itihas" (Hindi)
Dr. Natthan Singh (2004) : "Jat Itihas"
Jat Samaj, Agra: October–November 2004
Dr. Natthan Singh (2005): Sujas Prabandh (Gohad ke Shasakon ki Veer gatha – by Poet Nathan), Jat Veer Prakashan Gwalior

Rulers of Dholpur state
Knights Commander of the Order of the Indian Empire
1883 births
1911 deaths
Indian knights